Charge, Zero Emissions/Maximum Speed is a documentary film by Mark Neale. The film features the introduction of electric bike racing to the Isle of Man races.

The movie was available for sale on Region 1 DVD in 2011.

References

External links

Motorcycle racing films
Films shot in the Isle of Man
2013 films
British auto racing films
Documentary films about auto racing
2010s English-language films
Films directed by Mark Neale
British sports documentary films
2010s British films